James Lister may refer to:

 Jim Lister (born 1981), Scottish footballer
 James Lister (basketball) (1951–2010), American basketball player
 James Lister (footballer, born 1895) (1895–?), Scottish footballer
 James Lister (politician) (born 1976), Australian politician
 James Frederick Lister (1843–1902), Canadian lawyer, judge, and politician